Catanduanes's at-large congressional district, also known as Catanduanes's lone district, is the sole congressional district of the Philippines in the province of Catanduanes. Catanduanes has been represented in the country's various national legislatures since 1898. Since 1946 when it was reorganized as an independent province separate from Albay, Catanduanes has been entitled to one member in the House of Representatives of the Philippines, elected provincewide at-large, except for the period under the Fourth Philippine Republic between 1978 and 1984 when its representation was absorbed by the regional at-large assembly district of Region V.

The district is currently represented in the 19th Congress by Leo Rodriguez, who is an independent.

Representation history

Election results

2022

2019

2016

2013

2010

References

Congressional districts of the Philippines
Politics of Catanduanes
1898 establishments in the Philippines
1945 establishments in the Philippines
At-large congressional districts of the Philippines
Congressional districts of the Bicol Region
Constituencies established in 1898
Constituencies disestablished in 1901
Constituencies established in 1945